Same-sex marriage in Greenland has been legal since 1 April 2016. Same-sex marriage legislation passed the Inatsisartut unanimously on 26 May 2015. Approval by the Folketing followed on 19 January 2016, and the law received royal assent on 3 February.

Greenland, an autonomous territory within the Kingdom of Denmark, had previously recognised registered partnerships for same-sex couples from 1 July 1996 until 1 April 2016.

Registered partnerships
Denmark's registered partnership law had been in operation since 1 October 1989. A bill to expand its application to Greenland was approved by the Inatsisartut on 14 May 1993 by a vote of 15–0 with 12 abstentions, and by the Folketing on 28 March 1996 by a vote of 104–1. The bill was given royal assent on 26 April 1996, and took effect on 1 July 1996. The law gave registered partners nearly identical rights to married couples, with these notable exceptions:

 joint adoption of children
 laws making explicit reference to the sexes of a married couple did not apply to registered partnerships
 regulations by international treaties did not apply unless all signatories agreed

The first same-sex couple registered in 2002. Registered partnerships are called nalunaarsukkamik inooqatigiinneq in Greenlandic and registreret partnerskab in Danish.

The law was repealed on 1 April 2016. The ability to enter into a registered partnership was closed off on that date. Registered partners may retain their status or convert their union into a recognized marriage.

Same-sex marriage
A resolution, expressing Greenland's wish to opt in the current version of Denmark's marriage law, had its first reading in the Inatsisartut on 25 March 2015, and was approved unanimously on second and final reading on 26 May 2015.

Approval by the Folketing was required before the law could go into effect, however. A bill was submitted to the Folketing on 28 January 2015 and had its first reading on 26 May 2015. It was planned to come into effect on 1 October 2015; however, it lapsed due to the 2015 parliamentary elections. A nearly identical bill with only minor formal changes was submitted on 29 October and had its first reading on 5 November. The second reading happened on 14 January 2016, and the bill was approved in its final reading on 19 January. The bill was given royal assent by Queen Margrethe II on 3 February, and took effect on 1 April 2016. The first same-sex marriage in Greenland was performed on 1 April at the Hans Egede Church in Nuuk between Laila Mølgaard and Henriette Simonsen.

Article 1 of the Marriage Act now reads as follows:
 in Danish: 
 in Greenlandic: 
(The law applies to marriages between two persons of different sex and between two persons of the same sex.)

*Two MPs (Jess Svane (Siumut) and Iddimanngiiu Bianco (IA)) are not shown on the vote tally in the reference link above. Since there are 31 MPs in the Greenlandic Parliament, both names of these MPs are added in this second column just to complete the tally count.
ªThese three parties formed the Naalakkersuisut during the entire legislative process of this bill.

Marriages in the Church of Greenland
The Church of Greenland campaigned in favor of same-sex marriage legislation and worked closely with the government to ensure that same-sex couples would be able to have religious wedding ceremonies in the church. The Bishop of Greenland, Sofie Petersen, welcomed the legalization of same-sex marriage.

See also

 LGBT rights in Greenland
 Same-sex marriage in Denmark
 Same-sex marriage in the Faroe Islands
 Recognition of same-sex unions in the Americas
 Legal status of same-sex marriage

References

External links
 Lov om ændring af myndighedsloven for Grønland, lov om ikrafttræden for Grønland af lov om ægteskabets retsvirkninger, retsplejelov for Grønland og kriminallov for Grønland, Retsinformation.dk (in Danish)

LGBT rights in Greenland
LGBT rights
Greenland
Greenland
2016 in LGBT history
Greenland